The third presidential election of Nepal was held on 13 March 2018. As a new election law was developed (which is foreseen by the Constitution of Nepal) and as, due to the Nepalese election in 2017, an electoral college could be established, the election took place three years after the previous presidential elections despite the presidential term of office actually being set at 5 years. The President was elected by an electoral college composed of the members of federal parliament and provincial assemblies. The total number of voters was thus 880, however the 331 members of Federal Parliament have a vote weight of 79, while the 549 members of Provincial Assemblies have a vote weight of 48. In total 862 lawmakers participated in the election leading to a turnout of 97.95%.

Electoral college

Candidates

Communist Party of Nepal (Unified Marxist–Leninist)

Nepali Congress

Results
Bhandari's election was supported by her own party, the Communist Party of Nepal (Unified Marxist–Leninist) and coalition partner Communist Party of Nepal (Maoist Centre) as well as Federal Socialist Forum, Nepal, Rastriya Janata Party Nepal, Rastriya Janamorcha and Rastriya Prajatantra Party.

Bidhya Devi Bhandari received 245 votes of federal members, and 415 from provincial ones, resulting in 39,275 weighted votes. Kumari Laxmi Rai received 78 votes of federal members, and 116 from provincial ones, resulting in 11,730 weighted votes. Out of the 331 federal members, 323 cast valid votes, 3 voted blank and 5 abstained, while out of the 549 provincial members, 531 cast valid votes, 5 voted blank and 13 abstained.

Vice-presidential election
The election for the Vice President of Nepal was scheduled to take place on 23 March 2018. However, as incumbent Nanda Kishor Pun, was the only candidate for the office and no complaints were filed against him, he was declared Vice President of Nepal by the Election Commission on 18 March 2018.

Notes

References

Presidential elections in Nepal
2018 in Nepal
Nepal